Timpanogos High School is a public high school in Orem, Utah, United States. Opened to its first students in August 1996, it became part of the Alpine School District of Utah County.

The school mascot is the Timberwolf and the official school colors are blue, green, grey, and white.

In 2010, Timpanogos began a radio station, at KTWF 88.9 FM, and is no longer on the air .

Administration
The Principal is Dr. Joe Jensen, and Assistant Principals are Kyle Robinson, Ryan Francom and Rod Campbell.

Notable alumni
 Quinn Allman - guitarist for Utah-based rock band The Used
 Chelsie Hightower finalist in the top six on season four (2008) of Fox's reality dance competition So You Think You Can Dance; professional on the US version of Dancing with the Stars
 Allison Holker - finalist in the top eight on season two (2006) of dance-competition TV show So You Think You Can Dance 
 Paul Kruger - University of Utah defensive end (2008-2009); starting player in the University's undefeated Sugar Bowl Championship year; Super Bowl champion; player for the Baltimore Ravens (2009–2012); plays for the Cleveland Browns (2013–present)
 Bert McCracken - singer and for Utah-based rock band The Used 
 Jaymz Tuaileva - finalist in the top fourteen on season two (2006) of dance-competition TV show So You Think You Can Dance
 India Blue Severe - American social media influencer & star who is best known for her viral films, Instagram presence and the success of her global clothing brand Lonely Ghost.
 Tristen Ikaika Persons - Winning contestant who appeared on Popular American business reality television series "Shark Tank" and closed a deal with Canadian businessman, entrepreneur, and television personality Kevin O'Leary (nicknamed "Mr. Wonderful")

See also
 List of high schools in Utah

References

External links

 Official school website

Public high schools in Utah
Educational institutions established in 1996
Schools in Utah County, Utah
1996 establishments in Utah